Juan Manuel Cajigal y Niño (sometimes, Juan Manuel Cagigal y Niño in the orthography of the period) was a Spanish Captain General, born in Cádiz, in 1754.

Biography  
With more than two decades of service, Cajigal arrived in Venezuela in 1799 where he served in the Veteran Battalion of Caracas.  From 1804 to 1809 he served as governor of New Andalusia Province (capital, Cumaná) in eastern Venezuela.  Promoted to Field Marshal, he was named captain general of Venezuela in 1814. He oversaw the royalist advances carried out by José Tomás Boves, who acted in an independent manner. Cajigal resigned upon the arrival of Pablo Morillo in 1815 and left for Spain the following year.

In 1819 he was appointed captain general of Cuba and oversaw the restoration of the Spanish Constitution of 1812 in 1820.  That same year he resigned due to health problems and retired to Guanabacoa, where he died in 1823.

His cousin, General Juan Manuel Cagigal y Monserrat, was Francisco de Miranda's friend and commanding officer at the Battle of Pensacola during the American Revolutionary War.

His cousin-once-removed, whom he raised, was Venezuelan mathematician Juan Manuel Cajigal y Odoardo.

See also
Royalist (Hispanic American Revolution)

References
Bencomo Barrios, Héctor. "Juan Manuel Cajigal y Niño," Diccionario de Historia de Venezuela. Caracas: Fundacíon Polar, 1997. 
Parra Pérez, Caracciolo. Historia de la Primera República de Venezuela. Madrid: Ediciones Guadarrama, 1959.
Stoan, Stephen K. Pablo Morillo and Venezuela, 1815–1820. Columbus: Ohio State University Press, 1959.

Spanish generals
Cajigal, Juan Miguel
Governors of Cuba
People of the Venezuelan War of Independence
Independence of Venezuela
1823 deaths
Year of birth missing
People from Cádiz